Ludger Weeke (born 25 April 1949) is a German water polo player. He competed at the 1968 Summer Olympics, the 1972 Summer Olympics and the 1976 Summer Olympics.

References

External links
 

1949 births
Living people
German male water polo players
Olympic water polo players of West Germany
Water polo players at the 1968 Summer Olympics
Water polo players at the 1972 Summer Olympics
Water polo players at the 1976 Summer Olympics
Sportspeople from Hamm